Angela Bethany Goethals is an American film, television and stage actress. Goethals made her acting debut in the Broadway production of Coastal Disturbances in 1987, and later played the sister of Macaulay Culkin's character in Home Alone (1990). Throughout the 1990s, Goethals went on to star in several independent films and television shows, including a leading role on the sitcom Phenom (1993), as well as a small role in Jerry Maguire (1996).

In 1999, Goethals graduated from Vassar college with a B.A. in French before returning to acting.  In 2005, she landed a recurring guest appearance on 24, and also gained recognition and critical acclaim for her starring role in the black comedy horror mockumentary Behind the Mask: The Rise of Leslie Vernon (2006).

Early life 
Goethals was born and raised in New York City, New York, the daughter of Rosalind, a teacher who raised Angela and her sister Sara. She is a great-great-granddaughter of George Washington Goethals, the chief engineer of the Panama Canal, and namesake of New York's Goethals Bridge.

She was a cheerleader at Stuyvesant High School and was introduced to the acting world by actress Jeanie Hackett, a family friend, who took her to several auditions. At the age of nine she got her first professional acting job, as the understudy to Sarah Michelle Gellar in The Widow Claire, an off-Broadway play written by Horton Foote. Two years later Goethals appeared as the daughter of Edwin Booth, portrayed by David Strathairn, in a workshop production of Booth: A House Divided, at The Players, New York City.

Career
Goethals appeared in her first movie, drama Rocket Gibraltar, two years later. The cast included Burt Lancaster, Kevin Spacey and Macaulay Culkin. Her sister Sara also had a small part. Later that year Goethals also appeared in Heartbreak Hotel, a film directed by Chris Columbus about the fictional kidnapping of Elvis Presley.
Goethals's first starring role came in the 1993 TV series Phenom. She played Angela Doolan, a young tennis player struggling with the challenges of life including her single mother (Judith Light), obsessive tennis coach (William Devane) and bratty younger sister (Ashley Johnson). It ran for 22 episodes before being cancelled by network ABC in May 1994.

In 1990, Goethals played Linnie, the sister of main character Kevin McCallister (Macaulay Culkin), in Home Alone. The blockbuster family comedy, directed by Chris Columbus, is about a young boy facing two inept burglars when he's left home alone. The movie made nearly $500m worldwide. Goethals was one of only three main cast members not to return in the sequel, Home Alone 2: Lost in New York, two years later.

Goethals' next role in a blockbuster movie came in 1996's Jerry Maguire, a film that starred Tom Cruise, Cuba Gooding, Jr. and Renée Zellweger. Goethals played Kathy Sanders, Jerry's client who fakes tears when he calls her to inform her of his departure from the agency.

In 1999, Goethals graduated from the private liberal arts college, Vassar, with a bachelor's degree in French, in which she is fluent, and she rode in the IHSA Zone II Region 1 at the Advanced Walk-Trot-Canter level. In February 2002 she moved back to Los Angeles to pursue film and television. 

2002 saw Goethals star as Polly in Comedy Central's first original movie, Porn 'n Chicken. The movie was based on the true story of the Porn 'n Chicken Club at Yale University. Its members gathered weekly to eat fried chicken and watch porn. The club made headlines in 2001 when members announced plans to make their own porn film, entitled "The StaXXX". Despite a trailer being released for their film, it was never finished and no further footage ever emerged. Later in 2002, Goethals also starred in the 1980s based sitcom Do Over. The show featured Penn Badgley as 34-year-old Joel Larsen, catapulted back in time to 1981 and forced to relive his school life. Goethals played his sister, Cheryl.

Between 2003 and 2004, Goethals made guest appearances on the popular TV series Boston Public, Six Feet Under and Without a Trace, as well as playing a minor role in the Adam Sandler romantic comedy, Spanglish.

In 2005, Goethals made a recurring guest appearance on the TV show 24. She played Maya Driscoll, the mentally ill daughter of then Director of CTU Los Angeles, Erin Driscoll. Maya appeared in six episodes (including one uncredited) before committing suicide in a bathroom at CTU between 5pm and 6pm on Day 4. Since then, Goethals has gone on to make guest appearances on the TV series Grey's Anatomy, CSI and Crossing Jordan.

Awards and nominations
She was nominated four times to a Young Artist Award at the Young Artist Awards: in 1989 for Best Young Actress in a Motion Picture Comedy or Fantasy for Heartbreak Hotel (1988), in 1991 for Best Young Actress Supporting Role in a Motion Picture for Home Alone (1990), in 1992 for Best Young Actress Starring in a Motion Picture for V.I. Warshawski (1991) and in 1994 for Youth Actress Leading Role in a Television Series for Phenom (1993).

Theatre
 Coastal Disturbances (Broadway, 1987) .... Miranda Bigelow
 Approaching Zanzibar (Off-Broadway, 1989) .... Pony Blossom
 The Good Times Are Killing Me (Off-Broadway, 1991) .... Edna Arkins
 Four Baboons Adoring the Sun (Broadway, 1992) .... Halcy
 Picnic (Broadway, 1994) .... Millie Owens
 Hazelwood Jr. High (Off-Broadway, 1998)
 True History and Real Adventures (Off-Broadway, 1999)
 Be Aggressive (2001) .... Hannah
 Blur (2001) .... Dot DiPrima
 The Mandrake Root (2001) .... Kate Randall/Young Man
 As You Like It (2002) .... Rosalind
 House of Blue Leaves (2008) .... Little Nun
 Who's Afraid of Virginia Woolf? (Off-Broadway, 2009) .... Honey
 Nothing Sacred (2010) .... Becky Shaw
 Long Day's Journey into Night (2017) .... Kathleen

Filmography

References

External links 
 

Actresses from New York City
American child actresses
American film actresses
American television actresses
American people of Belgian descent
American people of Flemish descent
Living people
People from New York City
Stuyvesant High School alumni
Vassar College alumni
20th-century American actresses
21st-century American actresses
Year of birth missing (living people)